Ralph Hodgson (9 September 1871 – 3 November 1962), Order of the Rising Sun (Japanese 旭日章), was an English poet, very popular in his lifetime on the strength of a small number of anthology pieces, such as The Bull. He was one of the more 'pastoral' of the Georgian poets. In 1954, he was awarded the Queen's Gold Medal for Poetry.

He seems to have covered his tracks in relation to much of his life; he was averse to publicity. This has led to claims that he was reticent. Far from that being the case, his friend Walter De La Mare found him an almost exhausting talker; but he made a point of personal privacy. He kept up a copious correspondence with other poets and literary figures, including those he met in his time in Japan such as Takeshi Saito.

His poem The Bells of Heaven was ranked 85th in the list of Classic FM's One Hundred Favourite Poems. Quoting from the biography which accompanied the poem: "He was one of the earliest writers to be concerned with ecology, speaking out against the fur trade and man's destruction of the natural world."

Early life

He was born in Darlington in County Durham to a coal mining father. In his youth he was a champion boxer and billiards player and worked in the theatre in New York before returning to England. From about 1890 he worked for a number of London publications. He was a comic artist, signing himself 'Yorick', and became art editor on C. B. Fry's Weekly Magazine of Sports and Out-of-Door Life. His first poetry collection, The Last Blackbird and Other Lines, appeared in 1907.

It is said that his father was a coal merchant, and that he ran away from home while at school.

Poet and publisher
In 1912 he founded a small press, At the Sign of the Flying Fame, with the illustrator Claud Lovat Fraser (1890–1921) and the writer and journalist Holbrook Jackson (1874–1948). It published his collection The Mystery (1913). Hodgson received the Edmond de Polignac Prize in 1914, for a musical setting of The Song of Honour, and was included in the Georgian Poetry anthologies. The press became inactive in 1914 as World War I broke out and he and Lovat joined the armed forces (it did continue until 1923). Hodgson was in the Royal Navy and then the British Army. His reputation was established by Poems (1917).

In Japan
His first wife Mary Janet (née Chatteris) died in 1920. He then married Muriel Fraser (divorced 1932). Shortly after that he accepted an invitation to teach English at Tohoku University in Sendai, Japan. In 1933 he married Lydia Aurelia Bolliger, an American missionary and teacher there. While in Japan, Hodgson worked, almost anonymously, as part of the committee that translated the great collection of Japanese classical poetry, the Man'yōshū, into English. The high quality of the published translations is almost certainly the result of his "final revision" of the texts. This was an undertaking worthy of Arthur Waley and could arguably be considered Hodgson's major accomplishment as a poet.

Retirement in the United States
In 1938 Hodgson left Japan, visited friends in the UK including Siegfried Sassoon (they had met 1919) and then settled permanently with Aurelia in Minerva, Ohio. He was involved there in publishing, under the Flying Scroll imprint, and some academic contacts. He died in Minerva.

Later work
Arthur Bliss set some of his poems to music. His Collected Poems appeared in 1961, The Skylark (1959) having been his only new book (other than the collaborative work in the Man'yōshū,) in many decades.

Quotes
"Some things have to be believed to be seen."
"The handwriting on the wall may be a forgery."
"Time, you old gypsy man, will you not stay, put up your caravan just for one day?"
"Did anyone ever have a boring dream?"

References

 Ralph Hodgson and Aurelia Bolliger Hodgson Papers in the Bryn Mawr College Library
John Harding, Dreaming of Babylon: The Life and Times of Ralph Hodgson (London: Greenwich Exchange, 2008)
Mary Janet Chatteris  born 1875 died 1920 "Chatteris Family Tree"

External links 
Ralph Hodgson Papers. General Collection, Beinecke Rare Book and Manuscript Library, Yale University.

 
 

1871 births
1962 deaths
People from Darlington
Academic staff of Tohoku University
People from Minerva, Ohio
English male poets